Matthew Kiprotich Birir (born 5 July 1972) is a former athlete from Kenya, winner of 3000 m steeplechase at the 1992 Summer Olympics.

Biography
Born in Eldama Ravine, Matthew Birir started running, when he attended at the famous St. Patrick's High School in Iten, where many great Kenyan runners are rosen.

Career
At the Barcelona Olympics, the main favourite was Patrick Sang. At the Olympic final, it was soon clear, that all the medals are going to Kenya. At the last lap, the 20-year-old Birir outsprinted his older countryman Sang to win a gold 0.69 seconds ahead of latter.

At the 1993 World Championships Birir was beaten to fourth by Italian Alessandro Lambruschini, who repeated this feat three years later at the 1996 Summer Olympics, so Birir had to settle again with fourth place.

References

External links
 

1972 births
Living people
Kenyan male middle-distance runners
Kenyan male long-distance runners
Kenyan male steeplechase runners
Olympic athletes of Kenya
Olympic male steeplechase runners
Olympic gold medalists for Kenya
Olympic gold medalists in athletics (track and field)
Athletes (track and field) at the 1992 Summer Olympics
Athletes (track and field) at the 1996 Summer Olympics
Medalists at the 1992 Summer Olympics
World Athletics Championships athletes for Kenya